Adenanthos forrestii is a flowering plant from the family Proteaceae that can be found in Western Australia where it Declared to be Rare Flora.

References

dobsonii
Endemic flora of Southwest Australia
Taxa named by Ferdinand von Mueller